Sexton Glacier is located in the U.S. state of Montana in Glacier National Park.

References

See also
 List of glaciers in the United States
 Glaciers in Glacier National Park (U.S.)

Glaciers of Glacier County, Montana
Glaciers of Glacier National Park (U.S.)
Glaciers of Montana